XHTEKA-FM is a radio station on 91.7 FM in Juchitán, Oaxaca. It is part of CMI, the media company owned by the López Lena family, and known as Radio Teka.

History
XECA-AM 1480, based in Ciudad Ixtepec, received its concession on March 19, 1960 and signed on eight days later. It was owned by José Becerra Flores. It was sold to Bertha Cruz Toledo de López Lena in 1982 and moved to 1430 kHz. It moved again to 1030 and to Juchitán, this time as 500-watt XETEKA-AM, in January 1996.

XETEKA received approval to migrate to FM in 2010.

References

Radio stations in Oaxaca